The 2002 Calder Cup playoffs of the American Hockey League began on April 9, 2002. Twenty teams, the top ten from each conference, qualified for the playoffs. The seventh-, eighth-, ninth-, and tenth-placed teams in each conference played best-of-three series in the qualifying round. The four winners, in addition to the other twelve teams that qualified, played best-of-five series for conference quarterfinals. The remaining 8 teams played best-of-seven series for conference semifinals and conference finals.  The conference champions played a best-of-seven series for the Calder Cup. The Calder Cup Final ended on June 3, 2002 with the Chicago Wolves defeating the Bridgeport Sound Tigers four games to one to win the first Calder Cup in team history.

Chicago's Pasi Nurminen won the Jack A. Butterfield Trophy as AHL playoff MVP. Teammate Rob Brown recorded 26 assists, tying an AHL playoff record. The Chicago Wolves as a team also set three AHL playoff records during their Calder Cup run by playing 25 games, winning 17 games in one playoff, and winning 12 home games in one playoff.

Playoff seeds
After the 2001–02 AHL regular season, 20 teams qualified for the playoffs. The top ten teams from each conference qualified for the playoffs. The Bridgeport Sound Tigers were the Eastern Conference regular season champions as well as the Macgregor Kilpatrick Trophy winners with the best overall regular season record. The Syracuse Crunch were the Western Conference regular season champions. Division champions were automatically ranked 1-3.

Eastern Conference
Bridgeport Sound Tigers – East Division and Eastern Conference regular season champions; Macgregor Kilpatrick Trophy winners, 98 points
Lowell Lock Monsters – North Division champions, 96 points
Quebec Citadelles – Canadian Division champions, 88 points
Hartford Wolf Pack – 95 points
Manchester Monarchs – 90 points
Hamilton Bulldogs – 87 points
St. John's Maple Leafs – 87 points
Worcester IceCats – 86 points
Manitoba Moose – 86 points
Providence Bruins – 82 points

Western Conference
Syracuse Crunch – Central Division and Western Conference regular season champions, 96 points
Grand Rapids Griffins – West Division champions, 95 points
Norfolk Admirals – South Division champions, 92 points
Houston Aeros – 93 points
Utah Grizzlies – 91 points
Hershey Bears – 89 points
Chicago Wolves – 86 points
Philadelphia Phantoms – 86 points
Rochester Americans – 82 points
Cincinnati Mighty Ducks – 80 points

Bracket

The top 6 teams in each conference receive byes to the Conference Quarterfinals. In each round, the highest remaining seed in each conference is matched against the lowest remaining seed. In the qualification round, all games are played at the arena of the higher seed. In each round the higher seed receives home ice advantage, meaning they receive the "extra" game on home-ice if the series reaches the maximum number of games. There is no set series format for each series after the Qualification Round due to arena scheduling conflicts and travel considerations.

Conference Qualifiers
Note 1: All times are in Eastern Time (UTC−4).
Note 2: Game times in italics signify games to be played only if necessary.
Note 3: Home team is listed first.

Eastern Conference

(7) St. John's Maple Leafs vs. (10) Providence Bruins

1 – at Toronto
2 – at Brampton, Ontario

(8) Worcester IceCats vs. (9) Manitoba Moose

Western Conference

(7) Chicago Wolves vs. (10) Cincinnati Mighty Ducks

(8) Philadelphia Phantoms vs. (9) Rochester Americans

Conference Quarterfinals

Eastern Conference

(1) Bridgeport Sound Tigers vs. (9) Manitoba Moose

(2) Lowell Lock Monsters vs. (7) St. John's Maple Leafs

(3) Quebec Citadelles vs. (6) Hamilton Bulldogs

(4) Hartford Wolf Pack vs. (5) Manchester Monarchs

Western Conference

(1) Syracuse Crunch vs. (8) Philadelphia Phantoms

(2) Grand Rapids Griffins vs. (7) Chicago Wolves

(3) Norfolk Admirals vs. (6) Hershey Bears

(4) Houston Aeros vs. (5) Utah Grizzlies

Conference semifinals

Eastern Conference

(1) Bridgeport Sound Tigers vs. (7) St. John's Maple Leafs

(4) Hartford Wolf Pack vs. (6) Hamilton Bulldogs

Western Conference

(1) Syracuse Crunch vs. (7) Chicago Wolves

(4) Houston Aeros vs. (6) Hershey Bears

Conference finals

Eastern Conference

(1) Bridgeport Sound Tigers vs. (6) Hamilton Bulldogs

Western Conference

(4) Houston Aeros vs. (7) Chicago Wolves

Calder Cup Final

(E1) Bridgeport Sound Tigers vs. (W7) Chicago Wolves

See also
2001–02 AHL season
List of AHL seasons

References

Calder Cup playoffs
Calder Cup